The 1924 Wisconsin gubernatorial election was held on November 4, 1924.

Incumbent Republican Governor John J. Blaine won re-election to a third term, defeating Democratic nominee Martin L. Lueck and Socialist nominee William F. Quick.

As of 2018, this marks the last occasion that Walworth County has voted Democratic in a gubernatorial election.

Primary elections
Primary elections were held on September 2, 1924.

Democratic primary

Candidates
Martin L. Lueck, former circuit court judge

Results

Republican primary

Candidates
John J. Blaine, incumbent Governor
George Comings, incumbent Lieutenant Governor
Arthur R. Hirst, former state highway engineer

Results

Socialist primary

Candidates
William F. Quick, State Senator

Results

Prohibition primary

Candidates
Adolph R. Bucknam, Prohibition nominee for U.S. Senate in 1922

Results

General election

Candidates
Major party candidates
Martin L. Lueck, Democratic
John J. Blaine, Republican

Other candidates
Farrand K. Shuttleworth, Independent Progressive Republican, attorney
Adolph R. Bucknam, Prohibition
William F. Quick, Socialist
Jose Snover, Socialist Labor
Severi Alanne, Workers, director of the Co-operative Central Exchange (CCE) of Superior, Wisconsin

Results

References

Bibliography
 
 

1924
Wisconsin
Gubernatorial
November 1924 events